Lieutenant Commander John Bryan Peter Duppa-Miller, GC (22 May 1903 – 15 December 1994), born John Bryan Peter Miller, was a Royal Navy officer who was awarded the George Cross for his "great gallantry and undaunted devotion to duty" in bomb disposal work during the Blitz of late 1940.

George Cross
Temporary Sub-Lieutenant Miller, working closely with Able Seaman Stephen Tuckwell, defused and rendered safe numerous enemy bombs and mines. They were both awarded the George Cross for dealing with a parachute mine that had fallen into the soft mud bank of the Roding River, which runs into Barking Creek.

Sub-Lieutenant Miller commandeered a canoe and having put this on a fire-float with the UXB kit, he and Tuckwell ventured out into the river. They then left the River Fire Service fire-float and went on in the canoe, until they sighted the black rim of the mine which was stuck in the mud by the nose.

Tuckwell refused Miller's a suggestion that he should retire to a place of safety. He pointed out that as Sub-Lieutenant Miller would be working under at least a foot of water he would need someone to hand him the tools. They managed to get out one fuse, but could not reach the other, so appealed to several crane-drivers who had come to see what was happening, and they at once volunteered to help. The two experts got back into the water, put ropes round the mine, and with the assistance of the crane-drivers, the huge cylinder was dragged slowly out of the creek, over the muddy bank and up on to the wharf. The final stages of the operation were then completed.

Citation
His award was cited in the London Gazette of 14 January 1941.

Personal life
Miller's second wife was Clare (née Heald); his son by his first wife was a Conservative MP, Hilary "Hal" Miller.

Footnotes

British recipients of the George Cross
Royal Navy officers
Military personnel from Devon
Royal Navy recipients of the George Cross
Royal Naval Volunteer Reserve personnel of World War II
People from Birmingham, West Midlands
People educated at Rugby School
Alumni of Hertford College, Oxford
1903 births
1994 deaths
Bomb disposal personnel
Royal Navy officers of World War II